Porttipahta Reservoir is a large lake in the Kemijoki main catchment area. It is located in the region of Lapland in Finland.

See also
List of lakes in Finland

References

Reservoirs in Finland
Lakes of Sodankylä